The following lists contain names of engineers, scientists and technicians specializing in rocketry who originally came from Germany but spent most of their careers working for the NASA space program in Huntsville, Alabama.

Particularly after World War II, many engineers left Germany to pursue further rocket projects in the U.S. The majority had been involved with the V-2 in Peenemünde, and 127 of them eventually entered the U.S. through Operation Paperclip. They were also known as the Von Braun Group.

Before and after Operation Paperclip, other German experts arrived in the US by individual immigration without government links and would only later join various space projects, primarily at NASA.

Operation Paperclip scientists 

 Andreas Alexandrakis
 Rudi Beichel 
 Wernher von Braun, Director, Marshall Space Flight Center, Huntsville, Alabama from July 1, 1960 to January 27, 1970
 Werner Dahm
 Konrad Dannenberg
 Kurt H. Debus
 Ernst R. G. Eckert
 Krafft Arnold Ehricke 
 Anselm Franz
 Ernst Geissler 
 Dieter Grau
 Walter Häussermann 
 Karl Heimburg
 Emil Hellebrand
 Otto Hirschler
 Helmut Hölzer 
 Helmut Horn
 Hans Hueter
 Wilhelm Jungert
 Georg ("George") Emil Knausenberger
 Heinz-Hermann Koelle
 Hubert E. Kroh
 Hermann H. Kurzweg 
 Alexander Martin Lippisch
 Hans Maus
 Fritz Mueller 
 William Mrazek
 Erich W. Neubert
 Hans R. Palaoro
 Theodor A. Poppel
 Eberhard Rees
 Gerhard Reisig
 Georg Rickhey
 Werner Rosinski 
 Ludwig Roth
 Arthur Rudolph
 Friedrich von Saurma
 William August Schulze
 Walter Schwidetzky*
 Ernst Steinhoff 
 Heinrich Struck
 Ernst Stuhlinger 
 Bernhard Tessmann
 Adolf Thiel
 Albert Zeiler
 Theodor Karl Otto Vowe
 Georg von Tiesenhausen
 Friedwardt Winterberg
 Albin Wittmann
 Helmut Zoike
 Hans Hosenthien, Director of Flight Dynamics, Marshall Space Flight Center, Huntsville, Alabama

After Operation Paperclip  
 Fridtjof Speer
 Walter Dornberger
 Hermann Oberth
 Jesco von Puttkamer
 Guenter Wendt
 Robert Lusser
 Gert Schmitz

See also 
 Operation Paperclip
 Immigration
 Human capital
 Brain drain

References

 
German rocket scientists in the United States
German-American history
!
Marshall Space Flight Center
NASA people